Police Academy 5: Assignment: Miami Beach is a 1988 American comedy film directed by Alan Myerson. It is fifth installment in the Police Academy franchise, released on March 18, 1988. The film was given a PG rating for language and ribald humor.

Steve Guttenberg was unable to star in this film due to scheduling conflicts with filming Three Men and a Baby. The filmmakers decided instead to cast Matt McCoy as a new character.

Plot 
Captain Harris finally finds a way to become Commandant of the Police Academy; the incumbent Commandant Lassard is past due for mandatory retirement. Meanwhile, Lassard is chosen as "Police Officer of the Decade," he brings his favorite graduates—Sgts. Hightower, Jones, Tackleberry and Hooks, Lt. Callahan, and new graduate Officer Thomas "House" Conklin—to the National Police Chiefs Convention in Miami Beach to celebrate with him.  His retirement is postponed until after his return. While there, they meet his nephew, Sgt. Nick Lassard of the Miami Police Department. Lassard unwittingly takes a bag belonging to jewel thieves containing stolen diamonds.

As the jewel thieves try to get the bag back, Captain Harris tries to prove to Commissioner Hurst he should replace Commandant Lassard, the usual hi-jinks ensue, including Lassard trying to guess the annual procedural demonstration. When the jewel thieves kidnap Commandant Lassard, he goes willingly, thinking it part of the convention. A negotiation is botched by Captain Harris, getting himself captured as well. A chase across the Everglades ensues to rescue the oblivious Commandant.

In a standoff with the smugglers, Nick explains to his uncle it is not a demonstration and that his kidnappers are in fact real criminals. Upon hearing this, Lassard promptly disarms and subdues his assailants to the amazement of all the officers. At a ceremony at the end of the film, Commissioner Hurst announces that Commandant Lassard will be allowed to continue his duties as Commandant until he sees fit to retire, and Hightower is promoted to Lieutenant for saving Harris's life during the rescue.

Lassard is seen proudly graduating the new class. As revenge for Harris' earlier sabotage against his uncle, Nick intentionally moves the chair away from Harris. Proctor tries to help him, but kicks the chair too hard and sending both it and Harris on a collision into the drum set. As the police marching band walks off in parade, Harris is seen screaming for Proctor's help.

Cast

The Police Force 
 Michael Winslow as Sergeant Larvell Jones 
 David Graf as Sergeant Eugene Tackleberry 
 Bubba Smith as Lieutenant Moses Hightower 
 Marion Ramsey as Sergeant Laverne Hooks
 Leslie Easterbrook as Lieutenant Debbie Callahan  
 Tab Thacker as Officer Thomas 'House' Conklin 
 George Gaynes as Commandant Eric Lassard 
 G. W. Bailey as Captain Thaddeus Harris
 Lance Kinsey as Lieutenant Carl Proctor
 George R. Robertson as Commissioner Henry Hurst
 Matt McCoy as Sergeant Nick Lassard
 Janet Jones as Officer Kate Stratton

Others 
 René Auberjonois as Tony
 Archie Hahn as "Mouse"
 James Hampton as The Mayor of Miami
 Ed Kovens as Dempsey
 Scott Weinger as Shark Attack Kid
 Julio Oscar Mechoso as Shooting Range Cop
 Joe Del Campo as Convention Man
 Jerry O'Connell as Beach Kid
 Paul Maslansky as Homeless Man
 Graham Smith as Custody Sergeant S. Chlong

Reception

Box office 
Police Academy 5: Assignment Miami Beach debuted at number 1 at the box office when it opened on March 18, 1988 with a weekend gross of $6,106,661. It would go on to earn a domestic box office total of $19,510,371 and $54,499,000 worldwide.

Critical response 
On Rotten Tomatoes, the film has a 0% rating based on 6 reviews. On Metacritic, the film has a score of 18% based on reviews from 10 critics, indicating "Overwhelming dislike". Audiences polled by CinemaScore gave the film a grade B.

Gene Siskel of the Chicago Tribune gave the film zero stars, reporting, "I didn't laugh once during the entire film—not at the slapstick, not at the humor, which is pitched at the preschool level." His fellow Tribune critic Dave Kehr awarded one star out of four, describing the gags as "blunt and literal." Caryn James of The New York Times wrote that "the formula is pretty long in the tooth by now, and all the extra turns of plot can't disguise that." Michael Wilmington of the Los Angeles Times thought the film was an improvement over the previous three sequels but that the jokes were still "nothing special." Rita Kempley of The Washington Post called it a "fifth-rate rehash of the rather wonderful original." Nige Floyd of The Monthly Film Bulletin called it "the feeblest to date. Neither the picture-postcard setting nor the bungling jewel thieves add anything to the standard formula, while 'guest star' cops Nick Lassard and Kate Stratton hardly make up for the departure of regulars Steve Guttenberg and Bobcat Goldthwait."

Trivia
Filming was temporarily suspended when Hurricane Floyd (1987) hit southern Florida in October 1987.
Fontainebleau Miami Beach was also used as film location for the films Scarface (1983 film) , Goldfinger (film) , Tony Rome and The Bellboy
 The movie's script and some promotional materials list René Auberjonois' character Tony with full name Tony Stark. The surname was edited because Warner Brothers found out that Tony Stark was registered trademark by Marvel for the use in their Iron Man (comic book).

References

External links 
 
 
 
 

 5
1988 films
1980s police comedy films
American sequel films
1980s English-language films
Films directed by Alan Myerson
Films set in Miami
Warner Bros. films
Films scored by Robert Folk
1988 comedy films
Law enforcement in Florida in fiction
Films produced by Paul Maslansky
1980s American films